is a Ryukyuan gusuku in Kumejima, Okinawa, on Kume Island. It was built in the 15th century. The Miifugaa rock formation can be seen from the castle.

References

Castles in Okinawa Prefecture
Kumejima, Okinawa